A scratching post is a wooden post covered in rough material that cat owners provide so their pets have an acceptable place to scratch.  Cats have a natural urge to scratch: the action helps them remove old material from their claws, and they mark territory with scent glands in their paws. Indoor cats may be prevented from exercising this urge on furniture if they are provided with an acceptable scratching post.

The most common type of post consists of a wooden post, roughly 60–90 cm (24–36 inches) tall, covered in rough fabric or sisal.  The post is mounted vertically in a wide base, which allows the cat to stretch upward on its rear legs and scratch freely without tipping it over. A post that is unstable or does not allow a cat to fully extend its body might put off the cat from using it. Surfaces vary: the post may be covered in sisal rope, upholstery fabric, or the jute backing of a piece of carpet. Many pet owners say they have to experiment with different surfaces to find one that their cats will scratch reliably. Experts say that cats generally prefer sisal or corrugated cardboard surfaces. Other kinds of scratching posts are more elaborate, with several levels of horizontal platforms for climbing and cozy cave-like areas where cats may hide.  Very tall ones are often called "cat trees."  These may have a vertical tension rod that extends to the ceiling to provide extra stability.

Smaller scratching surfaces may consist of something as simple as a piece of carpet turned upside down, or a flat pad of woven sisal with a loop to allow it to hang from a doorknob.  Others are made from corrugated fiberboard.

Scratching posts may be purchased at most stores that carry pet supplies and online, like Amazon, Walmart, target and other stores. but many people build their own.

Types

See also
Cat tree

References

Cats as pets
Cat equipment